Nate Coggins (born 1978-09-25) is a former Arena Football League defensive specialist. He played for the Georgia Force (2005-2006), the Austin Wranglers (2007) and is playing the 2008 season with the Columbus Destroyers.

High school years
Coggins attended North Atlanta High School in Atlanta, Georgia and was a letterman in football, wrestling, and baseball. In football, he was named the Team's Most Valuable Player, received the Golden Helmet Award, and won All-City honors and All-Metro honors. In wrestling, he won All-City and All-Metro honors. He graduated from North Atlanta High School in 1997.

College years
Coggins attended the University of West Georgia and was a letterman in football. In football, he was a three-time All-Gulf South Conference selection, a two-time All-American, and was named the Gulf South Conference's Defensive Player of the Year as a junior.

References

1978 births
Living people
Players of American football from Atlanta
American football defensive backs
West Georgia Wolves football players
Georgia Force players
Austin Wranglers players
Columbus Destroyers players